"(Theme from) The Monkees" is a 1966 pop rock song, written by Tommy Boyce and Bobby Hart as the signature tune for the TV series The Monkees. Two versions were recorded – one for their first album The Monkees and a second shorter rendition designed to open the television show. Both feature vocals by Micky Dolenz. It is based loosely on the Dave Clark Five song (including finger snap intro) "Catch Us If You Can".

The full-length version was released as a single in several countries including Australia, where it became a hit, reaching No. 8. It also made Billboard Magazine's "Hits of the World" chart in both Mexico and Japan, reaching the Top 20 in Japan and the Top 10 in Mexico.  It is still played on many 60s radio stations. An Italian version of the song was featured on a Monkees compilation album. Ray Stevens did his take of the Monkees Theme on his 1985 album He Thinks He's Ray Stevens featuring a male German group of singers, Wolfgang and Fritzy, that are arguing during the refrain of the song. ("Hey Hey Bist Du Monkees".)

A slower version – sung by Boyce and Hart – was recorded for an early production of the pilot episode (16mm black and white). This can be found on the Special Features section of the Monkees season 1 DVD box set.

The song is featured in the trailer for the 1994 film Monkey Trouble, and it is used on the Minions film soundtrack.

The song is referenced in Big Sur (The Thrills song)

References

1966 songs
Songs written by Bobby Hart
Songs written by Tommy Boyce
The Monkees songs
Comedy television theme songs
Music television series theme songs
Song recordings produced by Tommy Boyce
Song recordings produced by Bobby Hart
1967 singles